East Liberty is a station on the East Busway, located in Shadyside and near the East Liberty and Larimer neighborhoods of Pittsburgh.

In 2015, the station was rebuilt, as part of the East Liberty Transit Center.

See also
 East Liberty Station

References

Bus stations in Pennsylvania
Martin Luther King Jr. East Busway